Dobrovce is a village in the Municipality of Miklavž na Dravskem Polju in northeastern Slovenia. It lies on the right bank of the Drava River southeast of Maribor. The area is part of the traditional region of Styria. The municipality is now included in the Drava Statistical Region.

The local church is dedicated to the Assumption of Mary and belongs to the Parish of Slivnica pri Mariboru. It was  built in 1934.

References

External links
Dobrovce on Geopedia

Populated places in the Municipality of Miklavž na Dravskem polju